Donald Guerrero Ortíz (born November 6, 1958) is a Dominican businessman, economist, and professor. He was the Minister of Finance of the Dominican Republic from 2016 to 2020.

Early life 
Guerrero Ortíz was born in San José de Ocoa on November 6, 1958. He is the son of Ángel Donald Guerrero Martínez and Francia Ortiz Arias.

He graduated in Economics from the Santo Domingo Institute of Technology, where he also completed postgraduate studies in Business Administration. Later, he completed a master's degree in Finance from the University of Maryland and a postgraduate degree in Banking and Finance from Chase Manhattan Bank, San Juan, Puerto Rico.

Career 
Guerrero Ortiz taught at various universities. He was a teacher of Microeconomics and Business Economics at the Pedro Henríquez Ureña National University (UNPHU). Additionally, he taught International and Corporate Finance at the postgraduate level at INTEC. He was professor of Business Strategy at the Pontificia Universidad Católica Madre y Maestra.

Minister of Finance 
Through Presidential Decree 201-16, he was appointed Minister of Finance to replace Simón Lizardo Amézquita in 2016. He held the position until August 16, 2020. He implemented measures to guarantee and safeguard the country's financial health.

In his four years of management, he took the following actions:

Economic stability: Before the COVID-19 pandemic, the Dominican Republic led economic growth in Latin America, Central America, and the Caribbean. In 2019, the country achieved gross growth of 5%.
Transparency and the fight against tax evasion: In 2018, the Dominican Republic joined the inclusive framework of the project against the Erosion of the Tax Base and the Transfer of Benefits (BEPS, as part of the efforts to apply the highest international standards in terms of tax transparency and elimination of tax evasion.)
Administration of public spending and management of public debt: Public spending in the Dominican Republic, before COVID-19, was one of the lowest in the region.
Collection record: 100% coverage of the estimated collections in 2018  increased State income.

Recognition

British magazine The Banker, from the Financial Times editorial group, chose Guerrero Ortiz as the 2018 Minister of Finance of the Year for the Americas.

He was among three prime ministers chosen in the “2016 Ranking: The Best Finance Ministers of Latin America” published by the main business, economy and finance magazine in the region, AméricaEconomía.

References 

1958 births
Living people
Finance ministers of the Dominican Republic
Dominican Liberation Party politicians
Santo Domingo Institute of Technology alumni
21st-century Dominican Republic politicians